Dreams and all that stuff is the eighth album by guitarist Leo Kottke.  It is the only completely instrumental album Kottke released on Capitol. It peaked at #45 on the Billboard Pop Albums charts, his highest position achieved on the Pop Albums charts.

It was re-issued on CD by BGO Records (CD132) in 1992 and One Way Records (S21-18462) in 1996.

Reception

Writing for Allmusic, music critic Bruce Eder wrote of the album "The shifting moods make this album, appropriately enough, a rather dreamlike experience... Kottke's own tunes are reasonably memorable, though the virtuosity tends to overshadow the music itself at times."

Track listing
All songs by Leo Kottke except as noted.

Side one
 "Mona Ray" (Leo Kottke, Michael Johnson) – 3:40
 "When Shrimps Learn to Whistle" – 3:28
 "Twilight Property" – 3:11
 "Bill Cheatham" (P.D.; arranged by Kottke and Hand) – 1:45
 "Vertical Trees" – 2:34

Side two
 Medley: "San Antonio Rose" / "America the Beautiful" (Bob Wills, Ward-Bates, P.D.; Bourne Co.; arranged by Kottke) – 2:03
 "Constant Traveler" – 3:50
 "Why Ask Why?" (Norman Gimbel, Ken Lauber) – 2:09
 "Taking a Sandwich to a Feast" – 2:45
 "Hole in the Day" – 2:50
 "Mona Roy" – 1:48

Personnel
Leo Kottke – 6 & 12-String Guitar
Mike Johnson – duet guitar on "Mona Ray"
Bill Berg – percussion
Bill Peterson – bass
Bill Barber – synthesizer, piano
Cal Hand – steel guitar, dobro
Herb Pilhofer – piano on "Why Ask Why?"
Jack “Birthday Party” Smith – piano on "Mona Roy"

Production notes
Denny Bruce – producer
Paul “Shorty” Martinson – engineer
Bob Berglund – mastering
John Van Hamersveld – album design, photography

References

External links
 Leo Kottke's official site
 Unofficial Leo Kottke web site (fan site)
The Capitol Years

1974 albums
Leo Kottke albums
Capitol Records albums
Albums produced by Denny Bruce